Boitron may refer to:

 Boitron, a commune of the Orne department in France
 Boitron, a commune of the Seine-et-Marne department in France